Imān Maleki (Persian: ایمان ملکی) (born 1976 in Tehran, Iran) is an Iranian Realist painter.

Life and career

Iman Maleki's fascination with painting began as a child. He started taking lessons in painting at the age of fifteen. His first and only teacher in painting was the celebrated Iranian painter Mortezā Kātouziān. His career as a professional painter began during this period. Maleki studied, from 1995, at the Fine Arts Faculty of University of Tehran, from where he graduated in Graphic Design in 1999. Since 1998 he has presented several exhibitions of his paintings. In 2000 Maleki established Ārā Painting Studio (آتلیه نقاشی آرا) where he also teaches painting.

During the Second International Art Renewal Center Salon (TM) Competition in 2005, Maleki was awarded The William Bouguereau Award – Emotion Theme and the Figure for his painting Omens of Hafez  (Fāl-e Hāfez) and a Chairman's Choice Award for his other painting, A Girl by the Window, (Dokhtari Dar Kenār-e Panjareh).

Maleki has been married since 2000. Maleki's Dizziness is featured at the Farjam Collection in Dubai at the exhibition Iran Inside Out. He is represented internationally by Artists Advocacy Group, an artists representation firm in Great Falls, VA.

See also 
 Islamic art
 Iranian art
 Iranian Art and Architecture
 List of contemporary Iranian scientists, scholars, and engineers
 List of Iranian artists
 Université du Québec à Montréal
 List of Iranian philosophers
 List of Iranian women writers
 Persian arts
 Photorealism
 Women's rights movement in Iran

Notes and references

External links
 Gallery of some paintings by Imān Maleki (click on the small pictures to enlarge)
 Shokā Sahrā'i, Reproduction, more alike than the original (Noskheh, mānā tar az asl), in Persian, Jadid Online, 15 May 2009, .Audio slideshow:  (6 min 30 sec).

People from Tehran
Iranian painters
University of Tehran alumni
1976 births
Living people
Realist painters
20th-century Iranian artists
21st-century Iranian artists